Bharawan is a village and corresponding community development block in Sandila tehsil of Hardoi district, Uttar Pradesh, India. Located 23 km from Sandila, it hosts a market on Mondays and Thursdays and has four primary schools and one healthcare facility. The main staple foods are wheat and juwar. As of 2011, the population of Bharawan is 10,443, in 1,649 households.

Demographic history 

The 1961 census recorded Bharawan as comprising 13 hamlets, with a total population of 4,314 (2,286 male and 2,028 female), in 838 households and 701 physical houses. The area of the village was given as 2,657 acres.

The 1981 census recorded Bharawan as having a population of 6,066, in 1,466 households, and covering an area of 1,074.88 hectares.

Villages 
Bharawan CD block has the following 97 villages:

References 

Villages in Hardoi district